Diego Martín Gurri Bentancor (born 23 February 1993) is a Uruguayan footballer who plays for Boston River.

References

1993 births
Living people
Uruguayan footballers
Uruguayan expatriate footballers
Boston River players
Club Atlético Tigre footballers
Deportivo La Guaira players
Argentine Primera División players
Uruguayan Primera División players
Uruguayan Segunda División players
Venezuelan Primera División players
Association football midfielders
Uruguayan expatriate sportspeople in Argentina
Uruguayan expatriate sportspeople in Venezuela
Expatriate footballers in Argentina
Expatriate footballers in Venezuela